Głogowiec  is a village in the administrative unit of Gmina Świnice Warckie, within Łęczyca County, Łódź Voivodeship, in central Poland.

Saint Faustina Kowalska, a Roman Catholic mystic and the secretary of Divine Mercy, was born here on August 25, 1905. Her house is now a museum. She was baptized and received the first Communion in nearby Świnice Warckie.

References

Villages in Łęczyca County
Religious museums in Poland
Divine Mercy